In Greek mythology, King Mygdon (Ancient Greek: Μύγδων) of the Bebryces, people who lived in Bithynia, in northern Asia Minor. He was the son of Poseidon and the Bithynian nymph Melia and thus brother of Amycus, also a Bebrycian king.

Mythology 
Mygdon was killed by Heracles on the way to Pontus to complete his ninth labour, which was to fetch the belt of Queen Hippolyte of the Amazons. After Heracles killed Mygdon, he gave his former lands to Lycus, who renamed the place Heraclea in honour of Heracles. The latter fathered a son named Berecynthus by Mygdon's daughter Astydameia after killing her father. . . .in a battle between him [i.e Lycus] and the king of the Bebryces Hercules sided with Lycus and slew many, amongst others King Mygdon, brother of Amycus. And he took much land from the Bebryces and gave it to Lycus, who called it all Heraclea.

Note

References 
 Apollodorus, The Library with an English Translation by Sir James George Frazer, F.B.A., F.R.S. in 2 Volumes, Cambridge, MA, Harvard University Press; London, William Heinemann Ltd. 1921. ISBN 0-674-99135-4. Online version at the Perseus Digital Library. Greek text available from the same website.
 William Smith. A Dictionary of Greek and Roman biography and mythology. s.v. Mygdon. London (1848).

Kings in Greek mythology
Mythology of Heracles